Manik Upadhyay was an Indian politician belonging to Trinamool Congress. He was elected as MLA of Barabani in 1988, 1996 and 2001. His son Bidhan Upadhyay is two term legislator of West Bengal Legislative Assembly.

References

Year of birth missing (living people)
Living people
Trinamool Congress politicians from West Bengal
West Bengal MLAs 1987–1991
West Bengal MLAs 1996–2001
West Bengal MLAs 2001–2006